Jaak Herodes (born 5 June 1944 in Kilingi-Nõmme) is an Estonian politician. He was a member of VII Riigikogu. From 1997 to 2002, he was the mayor of Käru.

References

Living people
1944 births
Members of the Riigikogu, 1992–1995
Mayors of places in Estonia
Social Democratic Party (Estonia) politicians
Recipients of the Order of the White Star, 5th Class
People from Kilingi-Nõmme